The George Street Co-op is a food cooperative located in New Brunswick, New Jersey.  The George Street Co-op runs a retail store at 89 Morris Street, selling foods and select hygiene and household products to the general public and to its membership.  The Co-op, as it is known to its members, maintains a focus on offering vegetarian, organic, local food, naturally grown and fair trade products.  This focus on vegetarian fare extends to The Namaste Cafe upstairs. The space upstairs also serves as a community space for everything from yoga classes to comedy shows.

History
The George Street Co-op was formed in 1973 when ten people from the Rutgers Vegetarian Club started a buying club out of a garage near George Street in New Brunswick. A year later, the Co-op moved to a new building on George Street and opened a small retail store.  In May 1988 the George Street Co-op purchased and moved into a new building at 89 Morris Street.

See also
 List of food cooperatives

References

External links
Official Website
Budi Organic Farm

Retail companies established in 1973
New Brunswick, New Jersey
Companies based in New Brunswick, New Jersey
Food cooperatives in the United States
Organic food retail organizations
Supermarkets of the United States
Buildings and structures in New Brunswick, New Jersey
Consumers' cooperatives in the United States
1973 establishments in New Jersey